Roberta Olivia Hodes (February 17, 1927 – January 19, 2021) was an American writer, director, producer, and script supervisor who was active from the 1950s through the 1980s.

Biography 
After graduating from Vassar College, she took acting classes in New York City alongside people like Rod Serling, Harry Belafonte, and Rod Steiger. She then spent time in Israel, where she got her first taste of the film industry working on a documentary.

She briefly went to Hollywood, where she got a job as a script reader. She quickly began to feel that she wouldn't have many opportunities as a woman in the industry, so she moved back to New York. There, she got her start as a script supervisor for Elia Kazan; three of her earliest credits were on On the Waterfront, Baby Doll, and A Face in the Crowd.

She later got into producing, was noted as one of very few female producers during the 1960s. She'd later co-write the 1962 film Lad, a Dog, and direct the 1977 film A Secret Space. Later, she'd work as a professor of film at New York University. She retired in the early 1990s after being beaten by a police officer and suffering lasting injuries.

Hodes died in New York City in January 2021, at the age of 93.

Selected filmography 
Director:

 A Secret Space (1977)

Writer:

 Lad, a Dog (1962)

Associate producer:

 Lad, a Dog (1962)
 Girl of the Night (1960)
 The Last Mile (1959)

Actress:

 Out of Evil (1951)

References 

1927 births
2021 deaths
American film directors
American screenwriters
American women film directors
American women film producers
American women screenwriters
New York University faculty
Vassar College alumni
People from New York City
American women academics
21st-century American women